Lorig is a surname. Notable people with the surname include:

Erik Lorig (born 1986), American football player
Joe Lorig (born 1973), American football coach
Kate Lorig (born 1942), American registered nurse and professor
Khatuna Lorig (born 1974), American archer of Georgian origin